Alejandro Gaxiola (born 15 January 1939) is a Mexican former swimmer. He competed in two events at the 1960 Summer Olympics.

References

External links
 

1939 births
Living people
Mexican male swimmers
Olympic swimmers of Mexico
Swimmers at the 1960 Summer Olympics
Swimmers from Mexico City
Pan American Games medalists in swimming
Pan American Games bronze medalists for Mexico
Swimmers at the 1959 Pan American Games
Medalists at the 1959 Pan American Games